Hyacinthe-Gabrielle Wellesley, Countess of Mornington (née Roland or Rolland; 5 November 1816) was a French actress who became the mistress, and later the wife, of Richard Wellesley, 1st Marquess Wellesley. As an actress, she was known as Gabrielle Fagan. Through her daughter, Anne, Roland was a great-great-great grandmother of Queen Elizabeth II.

Birth and paternity 
Roland was the legal daughter of Pierre Roland (or Rolland), a Paris-based merchant or banker, and Hyacinthe-Gabrielle Varis, an actress or milliner. The University of Southampton, which houses the Wellesley family papers, estimates Roland's birth year to be 1760. Cockayne's The Complete Peerage and Burke's Peerage estimate her birth year to be between 1766 and 1771 in editions published after her death.

There were rumours Roland's biological father was Christopher Alexander Fagan, and she was later adopted by Pierre Roland. The 1976 edition of Burke's Irish Family Records listed Roland as a natural born daughter of Varis and Fagan. Fagan family biographers have speculated Roland either lived in Ireland for several years prior to returning to France, or she was raised in Ireland by the Fagan family before joining her mother in France. Both claims are unproven.

Marriage 
Richard Wellesley, the son of Garret Wesley, 1st Earl of Mornington, met Roland at the Palais-Royal where she was an actress known as Gabrielle Fagan. She spoke no English at the time; however, she and Wellesley lived together for eight years without marrying. In 1781, Richard Wellesley succeeded as 2nd Earl of Mornington.

Roland and Wellesley married on 29 November 1794 at St George's, Hanover Square, London. Prior to their marriage, they had three sons and two daughters:
 Richard Wellesley (1787–1831), a Member of Parliament
 Anne Wellesley (1788–1875), married firstly Sir William Abdy, 7th Baronet, and secondly Lieutenant-Colonel Lord Charles Bentinck. Great-great-grandmother to Elizabeth II.
 Hyacinthe Mary Wellesley (1789–1849), married Edward Littleton, 1st Baron Hatherton
 Gerald Wellesley (1792–1833), served as the East India Company's resident at Indore.
 Rev. Henry Wellesley (1794–1866), Principal of New Inn Hall, Oxford.
Roland became the Countess of Mornington upon marriage, but she was a social outcast. Though Wellesley's mother, Anne, was eventually persuaded to receive her. In 1799, Wellesley was created the 1st Marquess Wellesley, making Roland a courtesy marchioness. However, this elevation did not change her social standing. Even the famously casual Viscountess Melbourne refused to call on Roland. The Viscountess Melbourne scolded her daughter-in-law, Lady Caroline Lamb, severely for doing so, writing of Caroline's friendship with Roland: "you are the only woman with any pretensions to character who ever courted Lady Wellesley's acquaintance".

Separation and death 

After their marriage, the Marquess Wellesley had two illegitimate children by another mistress, Elizabeth Johnston. In 1797, the Marquess Wellesley was obliged to travel to India in his capacity as Governor-General, Roland did not accompany him although he attempted to persuade her on many occasions. Roland was seeking evidence for a divorce as early as 1795.

In 1801, Roland's letters detailed accusations of her husband's infidelity with another woman, known only as Madame de Cocrement, and of severe neglect of his family. Upon the Marquess Wellesley's return to Britain in 1805, he purchased Apsley House as a family home. However, he took another mistress, and he and Roland were again estranged. The Wellesley's formally separated in 1810, and Roland moved from Apsley House. She lived in Grosvenor Square for some time, and then at Great Cumberland Place.

Roland died on 5 November 1816 at Teddesley Hall, Staffordshire, a house belonging to Edward Littleton, the husband to her daughter Hyacinthe-Marie. She was laid to rest at St. Michael's Church in Penkridge where her family posted a memorial.

References 

1766 births
1816 deaths
18th-century French actresses
French countesses
French marchionesses
French expatriates in England
Peerage of Ireland
Irish marchionesses
Wives of knights